Artūrs Irbe (born 1 February 1967) is a Latvian professional  ice hockey coach and former goaltender. Born during the Soviet era, Irbe played for various Soviet league teams and the Soviet Union national team before moving to North America in 1991. Irbe played in the National Hockey League (NHL) for the San Jose Sharks, Dallas Stars, Vancouver Canucks and Carolina Hurricanes. In 2004 Irbe returned to Europe to play until he retired in 2007. He has served as a goaltending coach with Dinamo Riga, the Washington Capitals and the Buffalo Sabres, as well as internationally with the Latvia men's national ice hockey team.

While serving with Buffalo in 2014 at the age of 47, he suited up after the injury of Michal Neuvirth to be the backup goaltender for Jhonas Enroth.

Playing career

Irbe was drafted in the 10th round, 196th overall by the Minnesota North Stars in the 1989 NHL Entry Draft.

His first professional hockey team was Dinamo Riga of the Soviet Hockey League (from 1987 to 1991). After playing in only 2 games during the 1986–1987 season Irbe got a chance to become Dinamo Riga's number one goaltender during the 1987–1988 season when their starting goaltender and Olympic champion, Vitali Samoilov went down with a long term injury. In his only full professional season, Irbe was outstanding in helping Dinamo Riga make it to the finals of the Soviet Hockey League where they eventually lost to perennial Soviet champions CSKA Moscow.  During this period he also played for the Soviet Union in the World Championships in 1989 and 1990. The Soviet team won those two championships and Irbe was honoured as the best goalkeeper of the 1990 tournament. He refused to play for the Soviet Union in 1991 because Latvia had proclaimed independence from the Soviet Union on 4 May 1990 and the Soviet government attempted to use military force in January 1991 to stop Latvia's independence. When the Moscow government sent tanks rolling to Riga, Irbe was among those who took to the streets and put up barriers to protect buildings, radio stations, TV towers and historical landmarks.

In the 1988–89 season, Irbe travelled to North America with his then club Dinamo Riga to play in a series of exhibition games against NHL teams. The next season (1989–90) he was temporarily added to the CSKA Moscow team during an exhibition tour of North America.

NHL
He began his playing career in America with the IHL affiliate of the San Jose Sharks, the Kansas City Blades. During the 1991-92 season with the Blades, he led the IHL in GAA, playoffs games played, playoffs minutes played, playoffs wins, playoffs most goals allowed, playoffs assists and playoffs penalty minutes, and led the team to win the Turner Cup league championship.

In the 1991–92, Irbe also played in 14 games with the Sharks, with whom he would remain until the 1995–96. With Irbe between the pipes, the newly established Sharks made their first playoff appearance in the 1993–94 season and upset the top-seeded Detroit Red Wings. That season, Irbe played an NHL record 4412 minutes in goal for the Sharks.  Irbe, affectionately known as Archie, was nicknamed "The Wall" and became a cult figure in San Jose, a status he enjoys there to this day. Following an injury (his hand being mauled by his pet dog in the offseason) and a poor 1995–96 season, Irbe was released by the Sharks.

For the next two years, he was a backup goaltender for the Dallas Stars and the Vancouver Canucks (for whom he played significant stretches with ample success) until he became the starter for the Carolina Hurricanes in the 1998–99 season. Irbe was picked to be a member of the World NHL All-Star team in the 1998–1999 season, where he became the first goalie to record an assist in an NHL All-Star game. The highest point of his career with the Hurricanes was 2001–02 when Irbe was instrumental in leading the Hurricanes to the Stanley Cup finals where they fell to the Detroit Red Wings.

Demotion to ECHL
After a disappointing 2002–03 season, the Hurricanes looked to demote Irbe because they could not move him due to the no-trade clause in his contract. On October 16, 2003, Irbe was assigned to the Johnstown Chiefs of the ECHL. After going 8–2–1 in 11 games with the Chiefs, Irbe was named as the starter for the Eastern Conference in the 2004 ECHL All-Star Game. However, Irbe was unable to participate due to a wrist injury. On March 19, 2004, Irbe was recalled to the Carolina Hurricanes after goalie Kevin Weekes was placed on the IR list due to season-ending hand surgery.

Last days in the NHL
Irbe played his last game in the NHL on April 4, 2004 against the Florida Panthers where he was replaced by Kevin Weekes in the third period after letting up six goals. The game would end in a 6–6 tie which would be the final tie in NHL history as the league moved to shootout in the following season in 2005–06.

In June 2004, he was traded to the Columbus Blue Jackets, but never played with the club due to that year's NHL lockout. After the lockout canceled the 2004–2005 season, Irbe never played in the NHL again but chose to continue his career in Europe.

Return to Europe
Irbe played for HK Riga 2000 in Latvia and EC Red Bulls Salzburg in Austria during the 2004–05 season. He signed with HK Dynamax Nitra playing in the Slovak Ice Hockey Extraliga, but he decided to leave after his unsatisfactory results.

Equipment
He is notable on the ice for his helmet and padding – he has worn them almost continuously since his NHL debut for the Sharks – which are creased and scuffed with puck marks and stains. He has earned the nickname "Michelin Man" as a result.

In the early 2000s, he placed an ad in the Ottawa Pennysaver seeking any local resident with the famed Jofa goaltender mask.

Coaching career
In 2008, Irbe signed a three-year deal with Dinamo Riga and worked as the goaltending coach for the club. In August 2009, Irbe cut ties with Riga and decided to go back to North America to be the goaltending coach of the NHL Washington Capitals after former goaltending coach Dave Prior stepped down due to family reasons. Irbe left the team on June 11, 2011, to spend more time with his family.

In 2013, Irbe was named as Ted Nolan's assistant for Latvian national team, but resigned a year after a dispute with president of Latvian Ice Hockey Federation Kirovs Lipmans over his coaching certification. In August 2014, Nolan again hired Irbe as an assistant, this time with the Buffalo Sabres.

In August 2017, Irbe became consultant for Latvian hockey league club HK Kurbads.

Personal
Irbe is also a member of board of directors of the Kids First Fund, a non-profit organization based in the United States which raises money for projects assisting abused and abandoned children in Latvia.

At the 2006 Winter Olympics in Turin, Irbe was Latvia's flag-bearer in the opening ceremonies.

Career statistics
Bolded numbers indicate season leader

Regular season and playoffs

International
Bolded numbers indicate tournament leader

Super Series statistics 
The Super Series were exhibition games between an NHL team and Soviet teams (usually a club from the Soviet Championship League). Irbe competed in two such series.

Awards

International

Soviet

IHL

NHL

San Jose Sharks

ECHL

San Jose

Transactions
 June 17, 1989 – Drafted by Minnesota in the 10th round, 196th overall
 May 30, 1991 –  San Jose in National Hockey League dispersal draft
 July 22, 1996 – Signed as free agent by Dallas
 August 5, 1997 – Signed as free agent by Vancouver
 September 10, 1998 – Signed as free agent by Carolina
 February 8, 2003 – Placed on waivers by Hurricanes
 June 16, 2004 – Traded by Hurricanes to Columbus Blue Jackets for future considerations
 December 5, 2005 – Signed as free agent by Salzburg
 November 18, 2014 – Signed as player-coach by Buffalo Sabres on an emergency backup contract

References

External links

 
 Artūrs Irbe at Hockey CCCP International
 Artūrs Irbe at HockeyGoalies.org
 
 
 

1967 births
Living people
Buffalo Sabres coaches
Carolina Hurricanes players
Dallas Stars players
Dinamo Riga players
HC CSKA Moscow players
Ice hockey players at the 2002 Winter Olympics
Ice hockey players at the 2006 Winter Olympics
Johnstown Chiefs players
Kansas City Blades players
Latvian ice hockey coaches
Latvian ice hockey goaltenders
Latvian sports coaches
Minnesota North Stars draft picks
National Hockey League All-Stars
Olympic ice hockey players of Latvia
San Jose Sharks players
Soviet ice hockey goaltenders
Ice hockey people from Riga
Vancouver Canucks players
Washington Capitals coaches
IIHF Hall of Fame inductees
Latvian expatriate sportspeople in Slovakia
Expatriate ice hockey players in Canada
Expatriate ice hockey players in Slovakia
Expatriate ice hockey players in the United States
Expatriate ice hockey players in Austria
Latvian expatriate sportspeople in the United States
Latvian expatriate sportspeople in Canada